is a 1997 V-Cinema erotic thriller film starring Mikiyo Ohno. It is the fifth installment of the Zero Woman film series.

Plot
Rei, an undercover assassin for the Zero Department, has been targeted by a rival organization.

Cast

Japanese cast
 Mikiyo Ohno as Rei
 Reina Tanaka as Naomi
 Ko Watanabe as Shiina
 Daisuke Ryu as Muto
 Kazuki Nagasawa as Gohara
 Yoshiaki Fujiwara as Yamamoto
 Daisuke Ikeda
 Norio Ishikawa
 Junji Tanaka
 Minoru Tanaka
 Katsumi Usuda
 Viktor Krüger as Yakusa bodyguard

English voice cast
 Carol Jacobanis as Rei
 Lynna Dunham as Naomi
 Buddy Woodward as Shiina
 Jonathan D. Boggs as Muto
 Tristan Goddard as Gohara
 Chris Winston as Yamamoto

Release
The film was released direct-to-video on May 5, 1997 on VHS by Maxam. The DVD version was released on November 24, 2000. Central Park Media released the film under their Asia Pulp Cinema label on November 11, 2003 with both Japanese and English audio and English subtitles. The English dub was produced by Central Park Media and was recorded at Audioworks Producers Group in New York City.

See also
 Girls with guns
 Zero Woman, for a list of other films in the series.

References

External links

1997 crime thriller films
1990s erotic thriller films
1997 direct-to-video films
1997 films
Central Park Media
Direct-to-video erotic thriller films
Japanese direct-to-video films
Japanese erotic thriller films
Japanese crime thriller films
1990s Japanese films